Archery at the 2016 Summer Paralympics was held between 10 and 17 September 2016 at the Sambadrome Marquês de Sapucaí in the Maracana zone of Rio de Janeiro, and consisted of nine events. The make up of those events changed substantially from the 2012 games, and consisted of three men's events, three women's events and three events for mixed gender teams. Men, women and mixed teams each competed in two events for compound bow, one for wheelchair athletes, the other open, and an open event for recurve bow, the bow used for all Olympic events.

Classification and events

Paralympic archers are given a classification depending on the type and extent of their disability. The classification system allowed archers to compete against others with a similar level of function. The categories have been reduced by one for 2016, with the two wheelchair classifications combined, and the replacement of 'standing' with an 'open' category. The W1 classification for wheelchair archers has been retained.

There are two categories of competition in Paralympic archery in 2016:

 Open - Athletes have an impairment in the legs and use a wheelchair or have a balance impairment and shoot standing or resting on a stool. Open category athletes may shoot in six events, in both recurve or compound competitions, under standard rules;
 W1 - Athletes may have impairment in the legs and make use of a wheelchair. W1 athletes may shoot either a recurve or a compound bow modified from standard rules, across three events. There are no separate competitions for the two disciplines, and in practice the W1 contests will be predominantly compound bow, as these take less power to wield than the recurve.

A third recognised Paralympic archery classification, V1, for visually impaired archers, is not part of the 2016 Games.

Qualification

Individual events

A National Paralympic Committee (NPC) could be allocated a maximum of thirteen qualification slots across the nine events, except for the NPCs of the 2015 Para Archery World Champions. It could also qualify a maximum of three archers per individual event, and could field a team of one man and one woman in the mixed gender team events, selected from individual qualifiers.

The majority of quota places were awarded for performances in the 2015 World Championships, and the continental qualification events (including the 2015 Parapan American Games). A smaller number are then awarded, if applicable, to the host nation, to the highest ranked archers at a Final Paralympic Qualifying tournament, and under the discretion of the tripartite committee.

Mixed team events

There is no direct qualification for the mixed pairs events, and an NPC may enter one team (1 man, 1 woman) per event if they have qualified those archers from individual events. However, since Rio 2016 quota places in individual events were awarded to the top finishers in the equivalent mixed pairs event at the 2015 World Para Archery Championships in Donau, Germany, a minimum number of teams per event is guaranteed.

Competition schedule

Competition lasts from 10 to 17 September. Each day from 11 September, 10 September being the Ranking Round for all archers, contains a morning and afternoon session, and will see at least one set of medals awarded.

The full daily schedule is set out below.

Participating nations
137 archers from 40 nations competed.

Medal summary

Great Britain topped the Archery medal table, thanks mainly to their domination of the W1 events, winning all three golds available, and taking the only clean sweep of the tournament by winning all three medals in the women's individual W1 event; outside of the W1 events, China and Iran were the most successful nations, sharing five golds and nine medals between them. Olympic number one nation, South Korea could not match their Olympic success, and exited the Games with three medals, a silver and two bronze.

Medal table

Events

See also
Archery at the 2016 Summer Olympics

References

 
2016
2016 Summer Paralympics events
International archery competitions hosted by Brazil
Paralympics